Venkata Pattabhi Raman (3 October 1932 – 2 December 1991) was an Indian lawyer and politician who served as the Advocate-General of Tamil Nadu from 1977 to 1979. His son Mohan Raman is an actor.

Early life and education 

Raman was born on 3 October 1932 in Madras and had his schooling at Church Park. On completion of his schooling, Raman graduated in Physics from Loyola College and studied law at Madras Law College completing his studies with a gold medal.

Politics 

Initially, Raman was attracted towards Communism. Later, however, he joined the fledgling Dravida Munnetra Kazhagam and in 1955, framed the constitution of the party along with E. V. K. Sampath and Era Seziyan.

References 
 
 
 

1932 births
1991 deaths
Advocates General for Tamil Nadu
20th-century Indian lawyers